Season of Migration to the North is a classic postcolonial Arabic novel by the Sudanese novelist Tayeb Salih, published in 1966; it is the novel for which he is best known. It was first published in the Beirut journal Hiwâr. The main concern of the novel is with the impact of British colonialism and European modernity on rural African societies in general and Sudanese culture and identity in particular. His novel reflects the conflicts of modern Sudan and depicts the brutal history of European colonialism as shaping the reality of contemporary Sudanese society. Damascus-based Arab Literary Academy named it one of the best novels in Arabic of the twentieth century.  Mawsim al-Hijrah ilâ al-Shamâl is considered to be an important turning point in the development of postcolonial narratives that focus on the encounter between East and West.

The novel has been translated into more than twenty languages. Salih was fluent in both English and Arabic, but chose to pen this novel in Arabic. The English translation by Denys Johnson-Davies was published in 1969 as part of the influential Heinemann African Writers Series. The novel is a counternarrative to Heart of Darkness. It was described by Edward Said as one of the six great novels in Arabic literature. In 2001 it was selected by a panel of Arab writers and critics as the most important Arab novel of the twentieth century.

Historical context 
In January 1899, a condominium, or joint-authority, was established to rule over Sudan by Britain and Egypt. Sudan gained independence in 1956, but was then engulfed in two prolonged civil wars for much of the remainder of the 20th century. This novel is set in the 1960s, a significant and tumultuous time in Sudan's history.

Summary 
Mawsim al-Hijrah ilâ al-Shamâl is the story of the “traveled man,” the African who has returned from schooling abroad, told to an unspecified audience by an unnamed narrator. The narrator returns to his Sudanese village of Wad Hamid on the Nile in the 1950s after writing a doctoral thesis on ‘the life of an obscure English poet.’ Mustafa Sa'eed, the main protagonist of the novel, is a child of British colonialism, and a fruit of colonial education. He is also a monstrous product of his time.

The unnamed narrator is eager to make a contribution to the new postcolonial life of his country. On his arrival home, the narrator encounters a new villager named Mustafa Sa'eed who exhibits none of the adulation for his achievements that most others do, and he displays an antagonistically aloof nature. Mustafa betrays his past one drunken evening by wistfully reciting poetry in fluent English, leaving the narrator resolute to discover the stranger's identity. The narrator later asks Mustafa about his past, and Mustafa tells him much of his story, often saying "I am no Othello, Othello was a lie," as well as "I am a lie."

The narrator becomes fascinated by Mustafa, and learns that Mustafa was also a precocious student educated in the West but that he held a violent, hateful and complex relationship with his western identity and acquaintances. The story of Mustafa's troubled past in Europe, and in particular his love affairs with British women, form the center of the novel. Mustafa attracts the women by appealing to their Orientalist fantasies, and all of these relationships end in tragedy. Three of the women commit suicide and the fourth, Mustafa's wife, is murdered by him. He stands trial for the murder and serves time in an English jail.

In the dramatic present, Mustafa drowns in the Nile, and his widow, Hosna, is pressured to remarry. She refuses, because she does not want to marry after her husband. She tries to appeal to the narrator, who was appointed the guardian of her sons in Mustafa's will. The narrator does try to foil the marriage, before it can take place, but he spends most of his time in Khartoum and therefore cannot exert much influence on the village. Hosna is married to Wad Rayyes against her will, and when he attempts to forcefully consummate the marriage, she kills him first and then proceeds to kill herself. Both are then buried without a funeral.

The stories of Mustafa's past life in England and the repercussions on the village around him, take their toll on the narrator, who is driven to the edge of sanity. In the final chapter, the narrator is floating in the Nile, precariously between life and death, and resolves to rid himself of Mustafa's lingering presence, and to stand as an influential individual in his own right. In the middle of the Nile, he yells, "Help! Help!" The novel ends upon that cry, and it is unclear whether his decision is too late, whether it is the right one, and whether he, others, and the country itself will receive the help needed.

Relation to other texts 
The novel can be related in many ways to the seminal works of Frantz Fanon, specifically Black Skin, White Masks. Fanon discusses the politics of desire between black men and white women, as Salih also explores extensively in the relationships of Mustafa Sa'eed. Also, it has been compared in many ways to Joseph Conrad's Heart of Darkness. Both novels explore cultural hybridity, cross-colonial experiences, and Orientalism.

The novel is also set in the same village, Wad Hamid, as some of Salih's other works, including The Wedding of Zein, Bandarshah, and others. Many of the novel's characters, such as Mahjoub and the narrator, recur in these other works as well. Thus, Ami Elad-Boulaski writes that Salih's depiction of Wad Hamid is more fully realized because a reader can track the development of characters throughout multiple novels and short stories.

Controversy 
Season of Migration to the North was initially published in 1966, in serialized form, by Hiwar, a Beirut-based literary magazine that was covertly established and funded by the CIA.

The novel was banned in the author's native Sudan for a period of time starting in 1983 because its graphic sexual imagery offended the Islamic government. Today the novel is readily available in Sudan.

Theater 

 Season of Migration to the North, adapted and directed by Ouriel Zohar, starring Mohammed Bakri. Bakri won the award for best actor in the 1993 Acco Festival of Alternative Israeli Theatre.

Editions in print 
 Season of Migration to the North, 1969 Heinemann
 Season of Migration to the North (hardcover), 1989 M. Kesend Pub. Ltd.
 Season of Migration to the North (paperback), 1970 Heinemann
 Season of Migration to the North: A novel (paperback reprint), 1980 Lynne Rienner Publishers
 Season of Migration to the North, 2003 Penguin Classics Series
 Season of Migration to the North, 2009 New York Review Books, Introduction by Laila Lalami
 Season of Migration to the North, 2017 Dongola Limited Editions Publishing, Artist's book limited edition of 30, 10 original etchings by Mohammad Omar Khalil

Notes

References 
Johnson-Davies, Denys, Memories In Translation: A Life Between The Lines Of Arabic Literature, American University in Cairo Press, 2006, .

Further reading 
The Wedding of Zein by Tayeb Salih

External links 
Review by Marina Harss at Words Without Borders
Essay by Mike Velez

Sudanese novels
1966 novels
Novels set in Sudan
Postcolonial novels
African Writers Series